Wrestling was one of the sports which was held at the 1962 Asian Games at Ikada Sports Hall in Jakarta, Indonesia between 25 and 30 August 1962. The competition included only men's events.

Medalists

Freestyle

Greco-Roman

Medal table

Participating nations
A total of 59 athletes from 8 nations competed in wrestling at the 1962 Asian Games:

References
 Freestyle result
 Greco-roman result

External links
UWW Database

 
1962 Asian Games events
1962
Asian Games
1962 Asian Games